Kikkerspuug (English translation "Frog spit") is a Dutch punk and hardcore band founded in 1984 in the city of Utrecht in the Netherlands.  Their lyrics are in Dutch, and their hardcore punk sound is influenced by heavy metal.

History 

During the period 1986 - 1990, Kikkerspuug produced cassettes and contributed songs to several samplers.  In 1990 they released their first LP "Wildvlees" (English translation: "Wild meat") through the record label Zooid/WRF Records.

In 2007 the band reformed with a new bassist, after a hiatus.  In 2013, Kikkerspuug produced their second full album "Springlelijk," (English translation: "Jumpy") which was self-released on bandcamp.  In 2020, the record label TCBYML re-released "Wildvlees."

DISCOGRAPHY 
 Galgemaal (cassette demo) 1988
 Wildvlees (LP, Album)	WRF Records/E Quality Records, 1990
 Springlelijk (CD, Album), Self-released on bandcamp, 2013
 Wildvlees ‎re-release, TCBYML label, 2020

Compilations 
 contributions to "On Our Way To Fools Paradise (12", Comp) 1986
 contributions to "Ack Ack Live Tape" (Cass, Comp)	Ack Ack Music	Ack Ack live tape	1986		
 contributions to "Speed Air Play 01-12-1988" (Cass, Comp, P/Unofficial)	1988		
 contributions to "Thrashold" (LP, Album, Comp) 1988		
 contributions to "Welcome To Our Scene" (LP, Comp) Stichting De Wijde Wereld, WRF Records 1990		
 contributions to "Is Punk Reall Dead?" B-Product Release
 contributions to "ZOOID Compilation 1" (LP, Ltd)	Zooid Equality Records	ZOO2D	1990	
 contributions to "Benefiet Teep"	X-treem		
 contributions to "Benelux Fight Back"

External links 
 Official Webpage
 Discogs
  Nederpunk, a rough guide to Dutch punk

References 

Dutch punk rock groups
Musical groups from Utrecht (city)
Musical groups established in 1984